State Route 142 (SR 142) is a  state highway in Marion County in the northwestern part of the U.S. state of Alabama. The western terminus of the highway is at an intersection with U.S. Route 278 (US 278) southwest of Guin. The eastern terminus of the highway is at an intersection with US 43/US 278 in Guin.

Route description
SR 142 begins at an intersection with US 278 (internally designated as SR 118) southwest of Guin. It heads northeast through forested areas, on two-lane undivided 11th Avenue. The highway enters the city limits of Guin at a crossing over Wickett Creek. It crosses over a BNSF Railway line and Purgatory Creek. The route turns more to the east as it begins to pass homes and businesses. It intersects the eastern terminus of Marion County Route 16 (CR 16). SR 142 continues east into the commercial downtown of Guin, ending at an intersection with US 43/US 278/SR 118/SR 171.

History

SR 142 was created in 1982 when US 278 was rerouted along a new roadway south of Guin.

Major intersections

See also

References

External links

142
Transportation in Marion County, Alabama
U.S. Route 278